Ilija Arnautović (7 July 192423 January 2009) was a Serbian and Yugoslav architect, known for many projects from the 1960s to 1980s in Serbia and Slovenia. He was born in Niš, Kingdom of Yugoslavia and died in Ljubljana, Slovenia.

Arnautović studied architecture from 1945 to 1948 in Prague, and from 1948 to 1953 in Ljubljana. He obtained his master's degree in 1952 under the guidance of Edvard Ravnikar. His architecture was based on thoughtful use of construction principles, construction techniques, and materials. His works are found throughout the former Yugoslavia and Algeria. He worked and lived in Ljubljana.

Works
His works include:
 1954–1955: Planning the Ljubljana Exhibition and Convention Centre
 1962: Skyscrapers on Linhart Street, Savsko neighbourhood, Ljubljana
 1965: Houses in Podgora, Ljubljana
 1967: Three-story apartment buildings on Šiška Street, Ljubljana
 1970: Apartment buildings on Črtomir Street, Savsko neighbourhood, Ljubljana
 1970–1974: Blok 28, Belgrade
 1973: Four buildings called "slepi Janez" on Šiška Street, Ljubljana
 1977: Project for the Hotel Obir***, 48 rooms in Bad Eisenkappel, Austria 
 1977: Five-story apartment buildings in BS-3, Ljubljana
 1981: Skyscrapers on Vojko Street, BS-3, Ljubljana
 1983–1986: Zhun II, Oran, Algeria

References

External links 
 Architectural guide 

1924 births
2009 deaths
Academic staff of the University of Ljubljana
People from Niš
Yugoslav architects
Serbian architects
Slovenian architects
University of Ljubljana alumni